The Pujiang line of Shanghai Metro is an automated, driverless, rubber-tired Shanghai Metro line in the town of Pujiang in the Shanghainese district of Minhang. It was originally conceived as phase 3 of Shanghai Metro line 8, but afterwards was constructed as a separate line, connecting with line 8 at its southern terminus, Shendu Highway. The line opened for passenger trial operations on March 31, 2018. The people mover was expected to carry 73,000 passengers a day. The line is colored grey on system maps.

The line is operated by Shanghai Keolis Public Transport Operation & Management Co. Ltd., a joint venture owned by Keolis and Shanghai Shentong Metro Group for at least five years after opening.

History

Stations

Service routes

Important stations 
  - Passengers can interchange to line 8.

Future expansion 
There are no plans to extend the line.

Station name change 
 On June 9, 2013, the Aerospace Museum was renamed  (before Pujiang line began serving the station).

Headways 
<onlyinclude>

Technology

Signalling 
The entire operation of the new line is remotely controlled from a central dispatch room. Trains operate using the Cityflo 650 communications-based train control (CBTC) from CRRC Puzhen Bombardier Transportation Systems Limited, a joint venture between Bombardier and CRRC Nanjing Puzhen Co., Ltd. The automatic trains had initially six staff members working at each APM station, but the operator hopes to reduce that to one or two.

Rolling stock 

The Pujiang line uses rubber-tyred Bombardier Innovia APM 300 trains. The trains have 4 cars each, totaling  in length, with capacity for 566 passengers per train. There are large windows at each end of the train allowing passengers to look out the front and rear. On 13 January 2017, Bombardier delivered the first out of 44 autonomous people movers to Shanghai.

References 

Rubber-tyred metros
Siemens Mobility projects
 
Shanghai Metro lines
Railway lines opened in 2018
2018 establishments in China